Cloakroom is an American shoegaze band from Northwest Indiana. They are currently signed to Relapse Records.

History
The band formed in June 2012. Lead singer and guitarist Doyle Martin was previously in the bands Grown Ups and Lion of the North, and bassist Bobby Markos was in the band Native. The band signed to Run For Cover Records in 2013. 

The band released their first extended play, titled Infinity, in 2013 via Run For Cover. In 2014, the band released a single "Lossed Over," also on Run For Cover. 

On January 20, 2015, the band released their debut album, Further Out, via Run For Cover Records. The album was produced by Matt Talbott of the band Hum.

In 2015, Cloakroom opened for Brand New after Jesse Lacey and his wife listened to Further Out. In the fall of 2016, they announced a tour of the UK and EU in support of Russian Circles. 

On June 20, 2017, the band announced that they would be releasing their second album, Time Well, via Relapse Records on August 18. 

On February 1, 2018, the band announced a two-week European tour with the band Caspian.

On November 30, 2021, the band announced that they would be releasing their third album, Dissolution Wave, via Relapse Records on January 28, 2022. Promotional materials for the album describe the album as "a space western in which an act of theoretical physics — the dissolution wave — wipes out all of humanity's existing art and abstract thought." A music video was released for the song "A Force at Play". The album features a guest appearance from Hum frontman Matt Talbott.

Members
Doyle Martin – lead vocals, guitar (2012–present)
Bobby Markos – bass guitar (2012–present)
Tim Remis – drums, backing vocals (2019–present)

Past members 

 Brian Busch  - drums, backing vocals (2012-2019)

Discography

Studio albums
Further Out (2015)
Time Well (2017)
Dissolution Wave (2022)

EPs
Infinity (2013)
Cloakroom on Audiotree Live (2013)

Singles
"Autumnal Equinox Singles" (2013)
"Lossed Over" (2014)
"Big World" (2016)
"Steve Albini's Blues" (2017)
"You Don't Know How" (2018)
"A Force at Play" (2021)
"Lost Meaning" (2021)
"Fear of Being Fixed" (2022)

References

Alternative rock groups from Indiana
Musical groups established in 2012
2012 establishments in Indiana